Plémet (Gallo: Plémaèu) is a commune in the Côtes-d'Armor department of Brittany in northwestern France. On 1 January 2016, it was merged with La Ferrière into the new commune Les Moulins, which was renamed Plémet in December 2017.

Population

Gallery

See also
Communes of the Côtes-d'Armor department

References

External links

Communes of Côtes-d'Armor

Communes nouvelles of Côtes-d'Armor